Seseli gummiferum, the moon carrot, is a species of herbaceous perennial plant in the family Apiaceae.

Description
It has a thick, branching stem with a basal rosette of greyish—green leaves and five-inch umbels of white flowers, sometimes with a pink tinge. This plant flowers from July to September.

Distribution
Seseli gummiferum is present in the Eastern Europe, in Aegean and the Crimea.

Habitat

References 
 BioLib
 Plant for a future

External links 

Apioideae